The Northern pikeminnow, Columbia River dace or colloquially Squawfish (Ptychocheilus oregonensis) is a large member of the minnow family, Leuciscidae. This predatory freshwater fish is native to northwestern North America, ranging from the Nass River basin to the Columbia River basin. A good deal of concern has been expressed regarding the impact northern pikeminnow populations may have on salmon in Columbia and Snake River impoundments.

Naming  
Until 1999, when the American Fisheries Society officially changed the common name to pikeminnow, the four species of Ptychocheilus were known as squawfish. The renaming effort was undertaken due to the word squaw being seen as offensive to Native American women.

Behavior and habitat 
Female northern pikeminnow reach sexual maturity at about six years, males in three to five. A mature female can lay 30,000 eggs annually. Pikeminnow are adept predators, and in the Columbia and Snake Rivers, salmon smolts comprise a large part of their diets. Their populations have flourished with the development of the Columbia River hydropower system. The reservoirs have provided excellent habitat for pikeminnow and given them an advantage over depressed salmon and steelhead populations. Data has been collected to suggest they can eat up to 650,000 salmon fry annually. 

The northern pikeminnow has been shown to consume terrestrial insects, benthic invertebrates, other fish, aquatic insects, and plant matter.

Relationship with people 

While historically northern pikeminnow have not been of interest commercially nor to sport anglers, Washington and Oregon state fisheries agencies and the Bonneville Power Administration have placed a bounty on them to reduce predation on scarce salmon stocks. A commercial fishery has developed based on that bounty.

References 

Ptychocheilus
Fish described in 1836